...Vous aiment is the third album by the French rock group Les Wampas, released in 1990.

Track listing

References

Les Wampas albums
1990 albums
French-language albums